John Greenwood (April 5, 1945 - July 7, 2015) was an American race car driver, entrepreneur and automotive performance car builder and engineer.

24 Hours of Le Mans
Greenwood raced three times at the 24 Hours of Le Mans - 1972 24 Hours of Le Mans, 1973 24 Hours of Le Mans, and 1976 24 Hours of Le Mans.

Trans-Am Series
He won the title for the 1975 Trans-Am season.

IMSA GT Championship
He won the pole position for the 1975 24 Hours of Daytona.

John Greenwood Racing
With Greenwood Corvettes he built many successful race cars.

References

External links

1945 births
2015 deaths
24 Hours of Le Mans drivers
24 Hours of Daytona drivers
Trans-Am Series drivers